Ramhormoz is the capital city of Ramhormoz County, Khuzestan Province, Iran. In ancient times it had been known as Samangan, having been established by the Sassanid king Hormizd I, although an Elamite tomb has been found as well.

According to a hadith in Sahih al-Bukhari, Ramhormoz is the ancestral homeland of Salman the Persian, a companion of the Islamic Prophet Muhammad.

History 

The proper history of the city begins in the Sassanid era, although there have been Elamite remains found in and around the city as well. The tomb of the Sassanid founder of the city, Hormizd I, is commonly thought to be situated within the city. "With the gradual Muslim conquest of Khuzestan in the 7th century, Rāmhormoz was the scene of a peace agreement between the local Sasanian satrap, Hormozān, and the commander of the Muslim army.". 

During the Islamic times, it was remarked by Muslim Geographers that the city contained a library comparable only to the one in Basra in the wealth of its collection, and that silk was produced in the city and distributed to distant lands. The city enjoyed incredible opulence before entering a state of decline.

The 14th century Muslim Moroccan Berber traveler and explorer, Ibn Battuta, visited the city during his travels and described the city as "a fine city with fruit-trees and rivers."

From late Safavid times until the Qajar era, the allegiance of the city frequently shifted between Khuzestan and Fars. In the 18th and 19th centuries, Lurs and Arabs started to settle within and around the city from nearby lands.

Climate 
Ramhormoz has a hot semi-arid climate (Köppen climate classification: BSh).

See also 

 Abū Muḥammad al-Ḥasan ibn ʻAbd al-Raḥmān ibn Khallād al-Rāmahurmuzī—an early Islamic scholar and hadith specialist

References 

Populated places in Ramhormoz County
Cities in Khuzestan Province
Sasanian cities